The knockout stage of the 2019 CONCACAF Gold Cup began on 29 June with the quarter-finals and ended on 7 July 2019 with the final at Soldier Field in Chicago.

All match times listed are EDT (UTC−4), as listed by CONCACAF. If the venue is located in a different time zone, the local time is also given.

Format
In the knockout stage, if a match was level at the end of 90 minutes of normal playing time, extra time was played (two periods of 15 minutes each), where each team was allowed to make a fourth substitution. If still tied after extra time, the match was decided by a penalty shoot-out to determine the winners.

CONCACAF set out the following matchups for the quarter-finals:
 Match 1: Winners Group B vs Runners-up Group A
 Match 2: Winners Group A vs Runners-up Group B
 Match 3: Winners Group C vs Runners-up Group D
 Match 4: Winners Group D vs Runners-up Group C

Qualified teams
The top two placed teams from each of the four groups qualified for the knockout stage.

Bracket

Quarter-finals

Haiti vs Canada

Mexico vs Costa Rica

Jamaica vs Panama

United States vs Curaçao

Semi-finals

Haiti vs Mexico

Jamaica vs United States
At 19:56 Central Time, in the 16th minute, the match was interrupted due to severe weather. The match resumed 88 minutes later at 22:24.

Final

Notes

References

External links
 

Knockout stage